McCandless Lunar Lander is a concept for a robotic lunar lander proposed as one of the commercial cargo vehicles for NASA's Commercial Lunar Payload Services (CLPS). The lander was proposed to NASA for funding by the aerospace company Lockheed Martin, and it is based on the successful Mars landers Phoenix and InSight.

Overview

On 29 November 2018, NASA announced the first nine companies, including Lockheed Martin, that are allowed to bid on contracts by the Commercial Lunar Payload Services (CLPS). These contracts are indefinite delivery, indefinite quantity contracts with a combined maximum contract value of $2.6 billion during the next 10 years. The contracted landers will transport commercial payloads focused on exploration, in situ resource utilization (ISRU), and lunar science.

The McCandless lander is named in honor of the late astronaut and former Lockheed Martin employee Bruce McCandless II, who in 1984 performed the first free-flying spacewalk without a lifeline to the orbiting Space Shuttle, using a jetpack built by the company.

Spacecraft

The McCandless lander design is based on the successful Phoenix and InSight Mars landers, designed and built by Lockheed Martin for NASA.

The lander's system incorporates on-board radars and a set of rocket thrusters for deceleration and soft-landing. It will not need the aeroshell and heat shield, as the Moon has no atmosphere. The lander is presently designed to operate for one lunar day (14 Earth days), but upgrades for enduring the lunar nights can be considered depending on mission requirements.

References

Proposed spacecraft
Missions to the Moon
Commercial Lunar Payload Services
Mining in space
Lockheed Martin